Mitch Inman (born 24 October 1988) is an Australian rugby union footballer. His regular playing position is either centre or wing . He represents the Rebels in Super Rugby.

Playing history
Inman is a graduate of Saint Ignatius' College in Sydney. His club was Sydney University where he was coached by 2012 Rebels coach Damien Hill. In the 2008 Shute Shield final Inman and his brother Dane found themselves in opposing teams: Mitch for Sydney Uni and Dane for Randwick.

In 2009 Inman trialled with the NSW Waratahs and toured with them to Fiji. He moved to Perth in 2010 and made his Super Rugby debut for the Western Force against the Brumbies. He played every round of the Force's 2010 season. He returned to NSW later in 2010 to help Sydney Uni contest the Shute Shield final, again, against Randwick. The teams included Wallabies Berrick Barnes for the students, and Kurtley Beale for Randwick. For the start of the 2011 Super Rugby season he was back in Perth with the Force but suffered a serious elbow injury during the round three clash with the Sharks. Later in 2011 he played at No. 13 outside James O'Connor at #12.

Inman signed, in mid-2011, a two-year contract with the Melbourne Rebels to commence in 2012. Other new recruits would include Beale (Waratahs), O'Connor (Force) and Paul Alo-Emile (Force).

International experience
Inman is a former Australian under-19s and Australian Sevens representative.

Super Rugby statistics

References

External links 
Rebels profile

Living people
1988 births
Australian rugby union players
Rugby union centres
Rugby union players from Sydney
Melbourne Rebels players
Western Force players
Melbourne Rising players
Australia international rugby sevens players
Australian expatriate rugby union players
Expatriate rugby union players in France
RC Toulonnais players
Oyonnax Rugby players